The Selkirk Fishermen are a junior "B" ice hockey team based in Selkirk, Manitoba. They are members of the Capital Region Junior Hockey League (CRJHL). The franchise was founded in 1917. 

The Fishermen won the Abbott Cup in 1920, making them the Junior Champion for Western Canada and earning a playoff against the George Richardson Memorial Trophy winning Eastern Champion for the Memorial Cup.  The Fishermen lost the Memorial Cup competition against the Toronto Canoe Club Paddlers.

History
Since 1978, the Fishermen have won a province-leading 11 Baldy Northcott Trophy championships as Manitoba Junior B champions.

In 1983, the Fishermen made history in Portage la Prairie, Manitoba, by defeating the Saskatoon Wesleys of the North Saskatchewan Junior B Hockey League to win the inaugural Keystone Cup championship. To this day, they are one of only two champions to have ever come out of Manitoba.

The team was a member of the Keystone Junior Hockey League until 2018.  For the 2018-19 season the Fishermen were one of five teams that departed the Keystone Junior Hockey League and established the Capital Region Junior Hockey League. In the initial season the Fishermen became the first league and playoff champions.

Season-by-season record

Note: GP = Games played, W = Wins, L = Losses, T = Ties, OTL = Overtime Losses, Pts = Points, GF = Goals for, GA = Goals against,   PCT = Winning Percentage

Keystone Cup
Western Canadian Jr. B Championships (Northern Ontario to British Columbia)Six teams in round-robin play. 1st vs. 2nd for gold/silver & 3rd vs. 4th for bronze.

Team information

Team captains
Chris Loschiavo; 2003–2006
Dave Hardman; 2007–2009
Matt Zakaluzny; 2009–2011
Trevor Paradoski; 2011–2014
Tanner MacVicar; 2014–2015
Tyndall Fontaine; 2015–2016
Drayton Mendrun; 2016–2018
Jeremy Thomas; 2018-2019

Coaches
Chris Poponick; 1999–present
Craig Cyr; 2013–2016
Al Hares; 1996–2013
Dave Boyce; 2008–present
Tyndall Fontaine; 2016 - Present
Jeremy Pachkowsky; 2016 - Present
Chris Loschiavo; 2008–2013
Blair Hawes; 2012–2014
Bryce Cooke; 2011–2013

External links

Official Team Site

Ice hockey teams in Manitoba
Sport in Selkirk, Manitoba
1917 establishments in Manitoba
Ice hockey clubs established in 1917